Styliola is a genus of gastropods belonging to the family Creseidae.

The genus has cosmopolitan distribution.

Species:

Styliola lamberti 
Styliola schembriorum 
Styliola sinecosta 
Styliola subula

References

Gastropods